Archie Perkins (born 26 March 2002) is an Australian rules footballer who plays for  in the Australian Football League (AFL).

Early life
Archie was born to mother Victoria and father Simon, both of New Zealand, who emigrated in their 20s. 
He studied at Brighton Grammar School in Melbourne. Perkins trained with well-known AFL players such as Hunter Clark and Max King as a part of the NAB AFL Academy program. He also played for the Sandringham Dragons in the NAB League, where he played a 6-game season in 2019, his coach at the time describing him as "a very confident kid,a pretty talented footballer and just a well-rounded person." Despite being touted as a midfielder, Perkins averaged 1.7 goals a game in the NAB League, as well as averaging 14.2 disposals.

AFL career
On debut, Perkins collected 14 disposals, 1 behind and 6 inside 50s. He received a Rising Star nomination after collecting 18 disposals, 4 marks and 3 goals in a dominant performance against .

Statistics
 Statistics are correct to the end of round 17, 2021.

|- style="background-color: #EAEAEA"
! scope="row" style="text-align:center" | 2021
|
| 16 || 14 || 5 || 12 || 92 || 97 || 189 || 43 || 34 || 0.4 || 0.9 || 6.6 || 6.9 || 13.5 || 3.1 || 2.4
|- class="sortbottom"
! colspan=3| Career
! 14
! 5
! 12
! 92
! 97
! 189
! 43
! 34
! 0.4 
! 0.9 
! 6.6
! 6.9
! 13.5 
! 3.1 
! 2.4
|}

References

External links

2002 births
People educated at Brighton Grammar School
Living people
Essendon Football Club players
Sandringham Dragons players
Australian rules footballers from Victoria (Australia)